The Michael Nobel Energy Award is a proposed prize announced in 2007 by some members of the Nobel family and the Nobel Charitable Trust (founded by Michael Nobel, Peter Nobel, Gustaf Nobel and Philip Nobel). It would award innovations in alternative energy technology. It has not yet been awarded. The prize would be awarded by the Nobel Charitable Trust and not by the Nobel Foundation, the organization that awards the Nobel Prizes.

The plan was announced at nanoTX 07. The Nobel Foundation quickly reacted by threatening legal action for "clear misuse of the reputation and goodwill of the Nobel Prize and the associations of integrity and eminence that has been created over time and through the efforts of the Nobel Committees". Michael Sohlman, Director of the Nobel Foundation and the elected head of the Nobel family disapproved to the institution of the so-called 'Dr. Michael Nobel Award' as well as the Nobel Charitable Trust (NCT) and Nobel Family Benevolent society.

References

Nobel Prize